Zulema (also Zuleima) is a Spanish-language feminine given name that may refer to:

Zulema (1947–2013), American singer
Zulema Castro de Peña (c. 1920–2013), Argentine human rights activist
Zulema de la Cruz (born 1958), Spanish pianist and composer
Zulema Fuentes-Pila (born 1977), Spanish distance runner
Zulema Jattin Corrales (born 1969), Colombian politician, and former Senator of Colombia
Zulema Maria Eva Menem, (born 1970), daughter of Zulema Yoma and Argentine President Carlos Menem
Zulema Tomás (born 1962), Minister of Health of Peru in 2019
Zulema Yoma (born 1942), former First Lady of Argentina
Zuleima Araméndiz (born 1975), Colombian javelin thrower

See also
Zuleyma, Mexican wrestler

Spanish feminine given names